Parsuram Majhi (born 1 December 1961) was a member of the 13th Lok Sabha and 14th Lok Sabha of India. He represented the Nowrangpur constituency of Odisha and is a member of the Bharatiya Janata Party (BJP) political party.

External links
 Members of Fourteenth Lok Sabha - Parliament of India website

1961 births
Living people
Lok Sabha members from Odisha
India MPs 1999–2004
India MPs 2004–2009
Bharatiya Janata Party politicians from Odisha
People from Nabarangpur district
National Democratic Alliance candidates in the 2014 Indian general election